

Match results

Friendlies

Liga I

League table

Results by round

Results summary

Matches

Cupa României

Players

Squad statistics

Transfers

In

Out

Club

Coaching staff

References

ASC Oțelul Galați seasons
Otelul Galati